The Mowers' Block is a historic commercial block at Seven Willow St. and 67-83 Blake Street in downtown Lynn, Massachusetts.  It was built in 1891 for the Mower & Brother shoemaking firm.  The brick and granite building was built on the site of the Mower's old factory, in which the Great Lynn Fire of 1889 started, destroying not just their factory but a large swath of downtown Lynn as well.  When completed, it was the largest building in the burned area.

It was added to the National Register of Historic Places in 1982, and was included in the Central Square Historic District in 1985.

See also
National Register of Historic Places listings in Lynn, Massachusetts
National Register of Historic Places listings in Essex County, Massachusetts

References

Commercial blocks on the National Register of Historic Places in Massachusetts
Buildings and structures in Lynn, Massachusetts
National Register of Historic Places in Lynn, Massachusetts
Historic district contributing properties in Massachusetts